Sha Elijah Biruar Dumama-Alba (born ) is a Moro Filipino lawyer who is a member of the Bangsamoro Transition Authority Parliament.

Early life and education
Dumama-Alba was born to parents who are both doctors and government workers and grew up in Cotabato City. She attended the University of the Philippines (UP) for her college education. Following her family's tradition, she initially pursued a preparatory medical course, but shifted to pursuing a law degree on her third year of university. She would pursue a bachelor's degree in public administration in UP and study law at the San Beda College.

Career
While pursuing a law degree at San Beda, Dumama-Alba worked at the Department of Agrarian Reform-Office for Foreign Assisted Projects. After passing the Philippine Bar Examination in 2007, she joined Buñag & Uy Law Offices which specializes in taxation, corporate, and labor laws. Dumama-Alba served as attorney at the Civil Service Commission-Autonomous Region in Muslim Mindanao. In 2013, she was appointed as legal consultant to the Bangsamoro Transition Commission.

She took the Special Shariah Bar Examinations in 2018, where she placed third.

When Bangsamoro was created in 2019, Dumama-Alba was appointed as Attorney General of the autonomous region under the cabinet of interim Chief Minister Murad Ebrahim.

Dumama-Alba would be appointed to the Bangsamoro Transition Authority on August 12, 2022 by President Bongbong Marcos and consequentially the Bangsamoro Parliament. She was a nominee of the Moro Islamic Liberation Front.  She was named majority leader of the legislature during the inaugural session of its second interim meeting on September 15, 2022. The position would be discontinued on September 20, 2022 and she was designated as floor leader instead.

References

Members of the Bangsamoro Transition Authority Parliament
Living people
Filipino Muslims
University of the Philippines alumni
San Beda University alumni
Filipino women lawyers
People from Cotabato City
Year of birth missing (living people)